Cool Boarders is a series of snowboarding video games published by Sony Computer Entertainment.

Games

Main series

Cool Boarders (1996)

Cool Boarders 2 (1997)

Cool Boarders 3 (1998)

Cool Boarders 4 (1999)

Spin-offs

Rippin' Riders Snowboarding (1999)

Cool Boarders Pocket (2000)

Cool Boarders 2001 (2000)

Cool Boarders: Code Alien (2000)

Notes

References

External links

Sony Interactive Entertainment franchises
Video game franchises
Video game franchises introduced in 1996